John Giles (fl. 1417–1435) was an English politician and attorney.

His wife was named Alice. He had two sons, including MP Robert Giles.

He was a Member (MP) of the Parliament of England for Old Sarum in 1417, Marlborough in December 1421, Calne in 1422 and 1423, Wilton in 1425, and Devizes in 1431, 1432 and 1435.

References

Year of birth missing
Year of death missing
Members of the Parliament of England (pre-1707) for Old Sarum
English MPs 1417
English MPs December 1421
English MPs 1422
English MPs 1423
English MPs 1425
English MPs 1431
English MPs 1432
English MPs 1435
Members of Parliament for Marlborough
Members of the Parliament of England (pre-1707) for Calne
Members of Parliament for Wilton